Niño Ramírez (born 16 January 1912) was a Filipino athlete.  He won a bronze medal in the long jump event at the 1934 Far Eastern Championship Games.  He also competed in the men's long jump at the 1936 Summer Olympics.

References

External links
 

1912 births
Year of death missing
Athletes (track and field) at the 1936 Summer Olympics
Filipino male long jumpers
Olympic track and field athletes of the Philippines
Place of birth missing